Clementine Ogilvy Spencer Churchill, Baroness Spencer-Churchill,  (1 April 1885 – 12 December 1977) was the wife of Winston Churchill, Prime Minister of the United Kingdom, and a life peer in her own right. While legally the daughter of Sir Henry Hozier, her mother Lady Blanche's known infidelity and his suspected infertility make her paternal parentage uncertain. 

Clementine (pronounced Clemen-teen) met Churchill in 1904 and they began their marriage of 56 years in 1908. They had five children together, one of whom (named Marigold) died at the age of two from sepsis. During the First World War, Clementine organised canteens for munitions workers and during the Second World War, she acted as Chairman of the Red Cross Aid to Russia Fund, President of the Young Women's Christian Association War Time Appeal and Chairman of Maternity Hospital for the Wives of Officers, Fulmer Chase, South Bucks. 

Throughout her life she was granted many titles, the final being a life peerage following the death of her husband in 1965. In her later years, she sold several of her husband's portraits to help support herself financially. She died in her London home at the age of 92.

Early life 

Although legally the daughter of Sir Henry Hozier and Lady Blanche Hozier (a daughter of David Ogilvy, 10th Earl of Airlie), her paternity is a subject of much debate, as Lady Blanche was well known for infidelity. After Sir Henry found Lady Blanche with a lover in 1891, she managed to avert her husband's suit for divorce because of his own infidelities, and thereafter the couple separated. 

Lady Blanche maintained that Clementine's biological father was Capt. William George "Bay" Middleton, a noted horseman; Mary Soames, Clementine's youngest child, believed this. However, Clementine's biographer, Joan Hardwick, has surmised (due in part to Sir Henry Hozier's reputed sterility) that all Lady Blanche's "Hozier" children were actually fathered by her sister's husband, Algernon Bertram Freeman-Mitford, 1st Baron Redesdale (1837–1916), better known as a grandfather of the famous Mitford sisters of the 1920s. Whatever her true paternity, Clementine is recorded as being the daughter of Lady Blanche and Sir Henry.

In the summer of 1899, when Clementine was 14, her mother moved the family to Dieppe, a coastal community in the north of France. There the family spent an idyllic summer, bathing, canoeing, picnicking, and blackberrying. While in Dieppe, the family became well acquainted with 'La Colonie', or the other English inhabitants living by the sea. This group consisted of military men, writers and painters, such as Aubrey Beardsley and Walter Sickert. The latter came to be a great friend of the family. 

According to Clementine's daughter, Mary Soames, Clementine was deeply struck by Sickert and thought he was the most handsome and compelling man she had ever seen. The Hoziers' happy life in France ended when Kitty, the eldest daughter, was struck with typhoid fever. Blanche Hozier sent Clementine and her sister Nellie to Scotland so she could devote her time completely to Kitty. Kitty died on 5 March 1900.

Clementine was educated first at home, then briefly at the Edinburgh school run by Karl Fröbel, the nephew of the German educationist, Friedrich Fröbel, and his wife Johanna and later at Berkhamsted School for Girls (now Berkhamsted School) and at the Sorbonne in Paris. She was twice secretly engaged to Sir Sidney Peel, who had fallen in love with her when she was 18.

Marriage and children

Clementine first met Winston Churchill in 1904 at a ball in Crewe Hall, the home of the Earl and Countess of Crewe. In March 1908, they met again when seated side by side at a dinner party hosted by Lady St Helier, a distant relative of Clementine. On their first brief encounter, Winston had recognised Clementine's beauty and distinction; now, after an evening spent in her company, he realised she was a girl of lively intelligence and great character. After five months of meeting each other at social events, as well as frequent correspondence, Winston proposed to Clementine during a house party at Blenheim Palace on 11 August 1908, in a small summer house known as the Temple of Diana.

Winston and Clementine were married on 12 September 1908 in St. Margaret's, Westminster. They honeymooned in Baveno, Venice and Veveří Castle in Moravia before settling into a London home at 33 Eccleston Square. They had five children: Diana (1909–1963), Randolph (1911–1968), Sarah (1914–1982), Marigold (1918–1921) and Mary (1922–2014). Only Mary, the youngest, shared their parents' longevity (Marigold died at the age of two and Diana, Sarah, and Randolph died in their 50s or 60s). The Churchills' marriage was close and affectionate despite the stresses of public life.

Politician's wife
During the First World War, Clementine Churchill organised canteens for munitions workers on behalf of YMCA in the North East Metropolitan Area of London, for which she was appointed a Commander of the Order of the British Empire (CBE) in 1918.

Clementine travelled to Dundee in 1922, campaigning on behalf of her husband in the 1922 general election while he was incapacitated after having his appendix removed.

In the 1930s, Clementine travelled without Winston aboard Lord Moyne's yacht, the Rosaura, to exotic islands: Borneo, Celebes, the Moluccas, New Caledonia, and the New Hebrides. During this trip, many believe that she had an affair with Terence Philip, a wealthy art dealer seven years her junior. However, no conclusive evidence of this has been produced: indeed, Philip was believed by many to have been homosexual. She brought back from this trip a Bali dove. When it died, she buried it in the garden at Chartwell beneath a sundial. On the sundial's base, she had inscribed:

HERE LIES THE BALI DOVE
It does not do to wander
Too far from sober men.
But there’s an island yonder,
I think of it again.

Clementine edited and rehearsed Churchill's speeches, as well as managing and attending high-level diplomatic summits.

As the wife of a politician who often took controversial stands, Clementine was used to being snubbed and treated rudely by the wives of other politicians. However, she could take only so much. Once, traveling with Lord Moyne and his guests, the party was listening to a BBC broadcast in which the speaker, a vehemently pro-appeasement politician, criticised Winston by name. Vera, Lady Broughton, a guest of Moyne, said "hear, hear" at the criticism of Churchill. Clementine waited for her host to offer a conciliatory word but, when none came, she stormed back to her cabin, wrote a note to Moyne, and packed her bags. Lady Broughton came and begged Clementine to stay, but she would accept no apologies for the insult to her husband. She went ashore and sailed for home the next morning.

During the Second World War, she was Chairman of the Red Cross Aid to Russia Fund, the president of the Young Women's Christian Association War Time Appeal and the Chairman of Maternity Hospital for the Wives of Officers, Fulmer Chase. While touring Russia near the end of the war, she was awarded the Order of the Red Banner of Labour.

In 1946, she was appointed Dame Grand Cross of the Order of the British Empire, becoming Dame Clementine Churchill . 

She was awarded honorary degrees by the University of Glasgow, University of Oxford and University of Bristol.

Later life and death
After more than 56 years of marriage, Clementine was widowed on 24 January 1965 when Winston died at the age of 90.

After Sir Winston's death, on 17 May 1965, she was created a life peer as Baroness Spencer-Churchill, of Chartwell in the County of Kent. She sat as a cross-bencher, but her growing deafness precluded her taking a regular part in parliamentary life.

In her final few years, inflation and rising expenses left Lady Spencer-Churchill in financial difficulties and in early 1977 she sold at auction five paintings by her late husband. After her death, it was discovered that she had destroyed the Graham Sutherland portrait of her husband because Sir Winston had disliked it.

Lady Spencer-Churchill died at her London home, at 7 Princes Gate, Knightsbridge, of a heart attack on 12 December 1977. She was 92 years old and had outlived her husband by almost 13 years, as well as three of her five children.

She is buried with her husband and children at St Martin's Church, Bladon, near Woodstock in Oxfordshire.

Memorials
The Clementine Churchill Hospital in Harrow, Middlesex, is named after her.

A plaque on the Berkhamsted house where the young Clementine Hozier had lived during her education at Berkhamsted Girls' School was unveiled in 1979 by her youngest daughter, Baroness Soames. A blue plaque also commemorates her residence there.

Arms

Notes

References

Sources

Biographies
 Lovell, M.S. (2012), The Churchills: A Family at the Heart of History – from the Duke of Marlborough to Winston Churchill, Abacus (Little, Brown), 
 Purnell, S. (2015), First Lady: The Private Wars of Clementine Churchill, Aurum Press Limited, 
 Soames, M. (2002), Clementine Churchill, Doubleday,

External links

 
The Papers of Clementine Churchill. Churchill Archives Centre, Cambridge
 
Winston & Clementine Churchill - UK Parliament Living Heritage

1885 births
1977 deaths
Burials at St Martin's Church, Bladon
Commanders of the Order of St John
Crossbench life peers
Churchill, Clementine
English Anglicans
People educated at Berkhamsted School
People from Mayfair
Clementine Churchill, Baroness Spencer-Churchill
Churchill
Winston Churchill
Wives of knights
YMCA leaders
Life peeresses created by Elizabeth II